2017 IWRF European Championship was the 11th international European wheelchair rugby competition, taken place between 27 June to 1 July. The championships was contested between Europe's eight top national teams and was held at the Conlog Arena in Koblenz, Germany. The tournament was won by Great Britain, their sixth title.

The four top placed teams of the competition, Great Britain, Sweden, France and Denmark were awarded four European qualification slots for the 2018 IWRF World Championship wheelchair rugby tournament.

Tournament
Eight teams contested the 2017 IWRF European Championship. The preliminary rounds consisted of a group stage where the teams were split into two leagues which were contested as a round-robin. The winner of group A then faced the second placed team from Group B and the winner of group B faced the second placed team from group A in elimination matches to determine the two finalists. The eventual winners, Great Britain, finished the competition unbeaten.

Preliminary round

Group A

Group B

Classification
Bracket

Medal round
Bracket

References

2016–17 in German rugby union
2016–17 in European rugby union
International rugby union competitions hosted by Germany
2017
2017 in wheelchair rugby